Randhawa  is a village in Kapurthala district of Punjab State, India,  from Kapurthala, which is both district and sub-district headquarters of KaRandhawahna. The village is administrated by a Sarpanch, an elected representative.

Demography 
According to the report by Census India in 2011, Randhawa had 82 houses and a population of 458, including 239 males and 219 females. Its literacy rate was 78.71%, higher than the state average of 75.84%. It had 40 children under the age of 6 years, or 8.73% of its total population, and its child sex ratio is approximately 739, lower than the state average of 846.

References

External links
  Villages in Kapurthala
 Kapurthala Villages List

Villages in Kapurthala district